Yaar Gaddar is a 1994 Indian Hindi-language action thriller film directed by Umesh Mehra, starring Mithun Chakraborty, Saif Ali Khan, Somy Ali and Prem Chopra.

Plot

Mithun is an honest police officer of the department and he is in love with Somy Ali. Even though he is a strict person to the outside world, he is lenient with his younger brother Jai at home. Jai is  a "happy go lucky" guy who falls in love with Shweta. Meantime, a group of five criminals (Prem Chopra, Gulshan Grover, Puneet Issar, Amrit Pal and Sheila) plots a bank robbery and Saif is implicated in the robbery, putting him on the run from the police. Officially, Mithun is assigned the task of arresting Jai at any cost and he makes all efforts to nab Jai, but fails. Another important character is the governor, the husband of Sheila. The situation becomes even worse when the members of the group are killed one by one. Mithun is now determined to catch Jai  dead or alive. Meanwhile, Mithun also reveals that his girlfriend Somy Ali is a bar dancer who works in the bar owned by the same criminals. On the other hand, Jai also tries to collect evidence to prove his innocence to his brother, but gets into a bigger problem as Somy Ali sees him coming out of the house of the criminal who was killed.

Cast
Mithun Chakraborty as Inspector Shankar Verma 
Saif Ali Khan as Jai Verma 
Somy Ali as Shashi 
Prem Chopra as Raghunath Singh 
Gulshan Grover as Raguvanth Singh(General)
Puneet Issar as Captain
Amrit Pal(actor) as Vishvas
Himani Shivpuri as Police Inspector 
Johny Lever as Police Inspector 
Yunus Parvez as Mulchand
Umesh Shukla as Sheila wife Kana's/bank chairman Kana
Sweta as Shashi
Anjana Mumtaz as Mrs. Verma

Soundtrack

The music of the film was composed by Anu Malik and the lyrics were penned by Qateel Shifai, Pooja Ahuja and  Dev Kohli . The soundtrack was released in 1994 on Audio Cassette in Weston Components Music, which consists of 6 songs. The full album is recorded by Kumar Sanu,  Alka Yagnik and Udit Narayan.

External links

References

1994 films
1990s Hindi-language films
Mithun's Dream Factory films
Cross-dressing in Indian films
Films shot in Ooty
Films scored by Anu Malik
Films directed by Umesh Mehra
Indian action thriller films